Marvel Legacy is a 2017–18 relaunch of a line of American comic books published by Marvel Comics. It is concurrent with All-New, All-Different Marvel and Marvel NOW! 2.0.

Publication history
On April 22, 2017, Marvel Comics announced Marvel Legacy at the Chicago Comic & Entertainment Expo. The goal of the Legacy initiative was to bring a greater focus to Marvel's core superheroes, unlike recent relaunches such as Marvel NOW!, which gave prominence to newer and younger heroes. Marvel Entertainment's chief creative officer Joe Quesada stated that company was embracing their roots with the creation of this new comic book line. Marvel Comics' editor-in-chief Axel Alonso noted that the relaunch was about reminding readers of the company's rich history by highlighting the connections between characters and reintroducing some iconic characters.

The relaunch began in September 2017 following the conclusion of the Secret Empire and Generations storylines with the release of a 50-page one-shot titled Marvel Legacy #1. Writer Jason Aaron and artist Esad Ribić collaborated on the opening issue and laid the narrative groundwork for the line. The issue introduces the first super hero team of Avengers that were active in the year 1,000,000 BC. The story spans the history of the Marvel Universe and explores the connection between the prehistoric Avengers and their present-day counterparts. Quesada teased the cover artwork for the opening issue, hinting at the possible return of Bruce Banner as Hulk and Tony Stark as Iron Man, Thor Odinson reclaiming Mjolnir, and the appearance of other superheroes in their classic costumes.

The series also sees the return of the original Wolverine after his initial death, with three Marvel Legacy titles: Captain America, The Amazing Spider-Man and The Mighty Thor, each with a Marvel Cinematic Universe-style post credits scenes; he also shows up alongside Captain Marvel and Star-Lord as one of the holders of the Infinity Gems in a crossover event. In addition, the original Jean Grey returns in her own limited series titled Phoenix Resurrection: The Return of Jean Grey in December followed by X-Men Red, which sees Jean Grey establish her own team of X-Men that consists of the new Wolverine, Nightcrawler, Namor the Sub-Mariner, Gabby (the new Wolverine's clone), Trinary (a new character), and Gentle (a mutant from Wakanda), and later by the Cajun mutant Gambit. Marvel Legacy #1 also brings Franklin and Valeria Richards back to the Marvel Universe. Marvel Two-in-One (a series featuring the Thing teaming up with other superheroes) was revived  with Thing's best friend Human Torch being the guest in the storyline "Fate of the Four", which focuses on both heroes trying to solve the mystery of Reed and Sue's disappearances, hinting at a possible Fantastic Four reunion.

Following the release of Marvel Legacy #1, many Marvel comic series reverted to their classic cumulative numbering system. For their relaunching series, Marvel created a new and consistent cover design that aimed to recapture their work from the 1980s and 1990s. Marvel released limited quantities of lenticular covers for their Marvel Legacy titles that pay homage to older covers. They also reintroduced elements such as the Marvel Value Stamp—a collectable clip-and-save program—and the self-published fanzine FOOM. Marvel included three-page primer stories in select Legacy titles to provide background information on their characters for new readers. Written by Robbie Thompson and illustrated by Mark Bagley, the primer stories covered classic moments from Marvel's comics.

The Legacy initiative was succeeded by Fresh Start, a line-wide relaunch by Marvel Comics in mid 2018.

Ongoing series
In June and July 2017, Marvel revealed the 54 series that make up the Marvel Legacy initiative.

Legacy one-shots
In addition to their ongoing series, Marvel planned reviving six cancelled comic book series along with their classic numbering as special one-shots that will be available in November and December 2017. However, Dazzler #43 which was planned, was not released with the other one-shots and was to be released in June 2018 as Dazzler: X Song.

Limited series and one-shots

Reception
According to Diamond Comic Distributors, Marvel Legacy #1 was the biggest selling comic book title of 2017.

References

2017 in comics
Marvel Comics storylines
Superhero comics
Comic book reboots